Hipponix subrufus is a species of small limpet-like sea snail, a marine gastropod mollusk in the family Hipponicidae, the hoof snails.

Distribution

Description 
The maximum recorded shell length is 13 mm.

Habitat 
The minimum recorded depth for this species is 0 m; maximum recorded depth is 780 m.

References

External links

Hipponicidae
Taxa named by Jean-Baptiste Lamarck
Gastropods described in 1822